The Denmark national junior handball team is the national under–20 Handball team of Denmark. Controlled by the Danish Handball Federation it represents Denmark in international matches. They are the team with the most medals in both the IHF Junior World Championship with 11 medals, and the European Junior Championship with 6 medals.

History

IHF Junior World Championship record

European Junior Championship record

Team

Current squad
This is the squad for the 2015 Men's Junior World Handball Championship

Legend
GK-Goalkeeper, LW-Left Winger, RW-Right Winger, LP-Line Player, BP-Back, LB-Left Back, CB-Center Back, RB-Right Back.

Honours
 IHF Junior World Championship
 Winner: 1997, 1999, 2005
 Runner-up: 1993, 2003, 2009, 2011, 2015, 2017
 Third place: 1983, 2007

 EHF Junior European Handball Championship
 Winner: 1996, 1998, 2008, 2010
 Runner-up: 2004
 Third place: 2006

Notable players

Kasper Jørgensen
Morten Olsen
Rene Toft Hansen
Sebastian Koch-Hansen
Henrik Møllgaard
Kristian Duvald Friis
Jonas Aaen Christensen
Klaus Hvidtfeldt Christensen
Mads Strange Pedersen
Simon Edelberg Jensen
Jacob Halle Petersen
Kenneth Olsen
Stephen Dyreborg Nielsen
Lasse Kronborg Rasmussen
Rene Bach Madsen
Simon Kristiansen

Kasper Hvidt
Joachim Boldsen
Michael Rasmussen
Jesper Jensen
Morten Jakobsen
Mads Storgaard
Lau Jakobsen
Morten Krampau
Lars Rasmussen
Sørenn Rasmussen
Claus Flensborg
Kasper Dan Jørgensen
Anton M. Jensen
Jonas Pedersen
Claus Møller Jakobsen

Notable coaches
 Flemming Pedersen

References

External links
 The Danish Handball Association 

Handball in Denmark
Men's national junior handball teams
Handball